The Memphis Showboats were an American football franchise in the United States Football League.  They entered the league in its expansion in 1984 and made the 1985 playoffs, losing in the semifinal round to the Oakland Invaders.  Perhaps the most prominent players on the Showboats' roster during their two seasons of existence were future Pro Football Hall of Fame member Reggie White and future professional wrestler  The Total Package Lex Luger.

History
Memphis food manufacturer Logan Young was awarded an expansion franchise for Memphis on July 17, 1983.  However, soon after hiring Memphis native and former college coach Pepper Rodgers as head coach and signing a lease to play in the Liberty Bowl Memorial Stadium, he discovered that most of his assets were tied up in a trust fund that he couldn't access.  Ultimately, he was forced to take on limited partners, then sell controlling interest to cotton magnate William Dunavant, remaining as team president.

Despite White's play, the Showboats finished fourth in the Southern Division and missed the playoffs.  Like the rest of the division, they were left far behind by the Birmingham Stallions and Tampa Bay Bandits.  However, like most of the USFL's other Southern teams, they were a runaway hit at the box office.  Indeed, they were one of the few teams whose crowds actually grew as the season progressed.

The Showboats broke through in 1985, finishing fourth in the East and earning a playoff berth.  They should have traveled to Denver's Mile High Stadium to face the Denver Gold.  However, the Gold's local support had practically vanished after the USFL announced it was moving to the fall.  ABC Sports did not want the embarrassment of showing a half-empty stadium.  It forced Harry Usher to give Memphis home-field advantage in the first round, since the Showboats had been among the league's attendance leaders once again.  The Showboats thrashed the Gold 48-7 before losing to the Oakland Invaders 28–19 in the semifinals.

The Showboats represented a serious attempt to form a viable professional football organization, and seemed to have a realistic chance to have been a viable business if the overall management of the USFL had been more realistic and financially sound.  Indeed, like the World Football League's Memphis Southmen before them, the Showboats appeared to be on more solid footing than the league as a whole.  The Showboats' attendance figures made Dunavant a supporter of the USFL's move to the fall.  Although Memphis was only a medium-sized market (while Memphis proper had 650,000 people, the surrounding suburbs and rural areas are not much larger than the city itself), Dunavant believed his team's popularity would have made it very attractive to the NFL in the event of a merger. After the USFL's antitrust lawsuit failed, the Showboats threw their support behind Charlie Finley's proposal to convince the Canadian Football League to expand into the U.S. market; the CFL rejected the plan, bringing the Showboats to an end.

Legacy
Despite the eventual failure of the USFL, the success of the Showboats franchise was noticed by the NFL, indicating a viable market in Tennessee. In 1997, the Houston Oilers franchise would move to Nashville, though they played their first season in Memphis, before moving to Nashville and being renamed the Tennessee Titans.

Dunavant emerged as an investor in the proposed Memphis Hound Dogs franchise that entered the NFL's 1993 expansion sweepstakes (the Hound Dogs lost to the Carolina Panthers and Jacksonville Jaguars). Rodgers and general manager Steve Erhart would later emerge with the Memphis Mad Dogs, a Canadian Football League franchise that played one season in 1995; Erhart would also manage the Memphis Maniax of the XFL.

In popular culture

In the SpongeBob SquarePants Season 2 episode "Band Geeks", the band led by Squidward Tentacles plays at the "Bubble Bowl", during which clips of a Showboats game (vs. the Tampa Bay Bandits at Liberty Bowl Memorial Stadium in Memphis on May 25, 1984) are shown.

A player from the Memphis Showboats appeared as a contestant on Press Your Luck in 1985.

Schedule and results

1984

Sources

1985

Sources

Single season leaders
Rushing Yards: 789 (1985), Tim Spencer
Receiving Yards: 1143 (1985), Greg Moser
Passing Yards: 2128 (1985), Mike Kelley

Season-by-season 

|-
|1984 || 7 || 11 || 0 || 4th Southern Division || --
|-
|1985 || 11 || 7 || 0 || 3rd Eastern Conference || Won Quarterfinal (Denver)Lost Semifinal (Oakland)
|-
!Totals || 19 || 19 || 0
|colspan="2"| (including playoffs)

References

External links
http://www.remembertheusfl.8m.com/teams/memphis.html
 USFL.info - Memphis Showboats

 
1983 establishments in Tennessee
1986 disestablishments in Tennessee